Frontal process may refer to:
 Frontal process of maxilla, a plate which forms part of the lateral boundary of the nose
 Frontal process of the zygomatic bone, forms the anterior lateral orbital wall